De Windhond is a windmill in the city of Woerden, Netherlands. The windmill sail spans .

The building is a prominent feature defining the skyline of the town. It is registered as a national monument.

History 
When the mill was built, it replaced an older mill that was on the same location. In 1877 the mill got a steam engine and in 1901 a gas turbine. In 1984 the mill was restructured, to be used as gristmill, and although the gas turbine still works today, the mill is usually operated by wind. The interior of the mill is pretty much in an original state, and until 2011 the miller lived in the house at the foot. The municipality of Woerden has owned the windmill since 1977.

Gallery

External links 
 
 Entry for De Windhond  in the Molendatabase (windmill database)

De Windhond
De Windhond
Tower mills in the Netherlands
Grinding mills in the Netherlands
Windmills completed in 1755